Agniolamia pardalis is a species of beetle in the family Cerambycidae. It was described by Karl Jordan in 1903.

Subspecies
 Agniolamia pardalis camerunensis Dillon & Dillon, 1959
 Agniolamia pardalis pardalis (Jordan, 1903)

References

Lamiini
Beetles described in 1903